The 2004–05 Texas Tech Red Raiders men's basketball team represented Texas Tech University in the Big 12 Conference during the 2004–05 NCAA Division I men's basketball season. The head coach was Bob Knight, his 4th year with the team. The Red Raiders played their home games in the United Spirit Arena in Lubbock, Texas.

Roster

Schedule and results

|-
!colspan=9 style=| Regular season

|-
!colspan=9 style=| Big 12 Tournament

|-
!colspan=9 style=| NCAA Tournament

References

Texas Tech Red Raiders basketball seasons
Texas Tech
Texas Tech
Texas Tech
Texas Tech